is a Japanese manga written and illustrated by Shunji Sonoyama. It spawned two other manga, two anime television series, a television drama, and an anime film. The first TV series mark the debut of Joe Hisaishi, composer of My Neighbor Totoro and Spirited Away. The official English title is Gon, The Stone-Age Boy.

Media

Manga 
It was first published from 1965 to 1975 in Jitsugyo no Nihon Sha's Weekly Manga Sunday, and spawned two spin-off manga: the first, entitled  and illustrated by Hideo Shinoda, was published in Gakken's Gakushū Magazine in 1966; the second, entitled , was published by Shogakukan's Gakunen Magazine in 1974.

Shunji Sonoyama won the 1976 Bungeishunjū Manga Award for his work on the manga series.

Anime series
The third manga was adapted by Tokyo Movie into a homonymous anime television series consisting in 77 episodes, which was broadcast on ABC between October 5, 1974, and March 27, 1976. Another anime was produced; this time Studio Pierrot adapted the second manga into a series directed by Yutaka Kagawa that originally ran from April 3, 1996, to January 22, 1997, in NHK-BS2.

Cast
First Human Giatrus
Gon: Hiroko Maruyama
Father: Kaneta Kimotsuki
Mother: Keiko Hanagata
Dotechin: Kazuya Tatekabe
Piko-chan: Rihoko Yoshida
Source:

First Human Gon
Gon: Ikue Ōtani
Father: Kenichi Ogata
Mather: Miyuki Ichijō
Dotechin: Chafurin
Piko-chan: Tomoko Kawakami
Mammoth / Saber-tooth tiger: Kazuhiro Ōguro
Shinigami: Kōji Ishii
Source:

Film 
First Human Giatrus was adapted by Tokyo Movie into an anime film, which was released by Toho on March 15, 1975.

TV drama 
The manga was adapted into a live-action Japanese television drama entitled . It was produced by Koji Matsuoka and starred Ryoko Takizawa, Katsuhisa Namase and Toshiya Sakai.

References

External links
  
 
 
 

1965 manga
1966 manga
1974 anime television series debuts
1974 manga
1976 Japanese television series endings
1996 anime television series debuts
1997 Japanese television series endings
Animated films based on manga
Anime series based on manga
Comedy anime and manga
Comics set in prehistory
Fictional prehistoric characters
Japanese animated films
1970s Japanese-language films
Jitsugyo no Nihon Sha manga
Manga adapted into films
NHK original programming
Pierrot (company)
Shogakukan franchises
Shogakukan manga
TMS Entertainment
TBS Television (Japan) original programming